Legend of the Fox, also known as Legend of a Fox, is a 1980 Hong Kong film based on Louis Cha's novel The Young Flying Fox. It was produced by the Shaw Brothers Studio, directed by Chang Cheh and starred the Venom Mob. The film used to be one of the most rare Venom Mob martial arts film available, but has been digitally remastered and released by Celestial Pictures.

Plot 
It tells the story of a young man named Hu Fei, as he escapes the rain with his uncle. Whilst they're undercover and Fei is looking after his sick uncle, a group of men walk in that Fei's uncle recognizes.  He then tells Fei the story of how is father was killed. So, Hu Fei decides to seek revenge on those people.

Cast
 Chin Siu-ho as Hu Fei/Flying fox
 Lu Feng as Hu Yidao
 Philip Kwok as Miao Renfeng/Golden face Buddha
 Wong Man-yee as Cheng Lingsu
 Chiang Sheng as Tian Guinong
 Helen Poon Bing-seung as Hu Yidao's wife
 Choh Seung-wan as Nan Lan
 Wang Li as Shi Wancheng
 Yu Tai-ping as Dr. Yan Chi
 Wang Han-chen as Innkeeper
 Lai Yau-hing as Ping Ah Shi/Fei's 4th uncle
 Leung Chi-hung as Xue Que
 Chow Kin-ping as Murong Jingyue
 Tony Tam Chun-to as Jiang Tieshan
 Hung Fung as Shang Jianming
 Siao Yuk as Shang Baozhen
 Lui Hung as Baozhen's mother
 Leung Cheuk-kwan as Zhang Feixiong
 Chan Shu-kei as Zhong Zhaoying
 Chan Hon-kwong as Zhong Zhaowen
 Wan Seung-lam as Guinong's man
 Lam Wai as Guinong's man
 Lam Chi-tai as Guinong's bodyguard
 Chan Hung as Guinong's bodyguard
 Ha Kwok-wing as Guinong's thug
 Wong Wa as Yan Chi's thug
 Wong Siu-ming as Baozhen's servant
 Ngai Tim-choi as Baozhen's man
 Hung San-nam as Guinong's blade carrier
 Choi Kwok-keung as Yan Chi's thug
 Tam Wai-man as Yan Chi's thug
 Stephen Chan Yung as Guinong's thug
 Fung Ming as inn waiter

External links
 
 

1980 films
Films based on works by Jin Yong
Hong Kong martial arts films
Shaw Brothers Studio films
Films set in the Qing dynasty
Wuxia films
Works based on Flying Fox of Snowy Mountain
Films directed by Chang Cheh
1980s Hong Kong films